Bobotov Kuk is a peak in northern Montenegro. At , it is the highest peak in the Durmitor mountain range and had been thought to be the highest point in Montenegro. New surveys have shown there are three higher peaks on the border with Albania. Most Montenegrin mountains are visible from Bobotov Kuk, among them Lovćen (above the Adriatic Sea), Kopaonik and Tara (in Serbia), Maglić (in Bosnia and Herzegovina).

The first recorded ascent of Bobotov Kuk was in 1883 by an Austrian cartographer, Oscar Baumann. The first organized mountaineering group from Zagreb came to Durmitor in 1926. In 1931 two Austrians completed the first winter ascent to Bezimeni vrh.

Peak and surroundings
The northern and eastern sides of the compact summit pyramid, which is around 200m high, rise above steep scree slopes that descend into a large rocky basin, Valoviti Do, at around 2000 to 2100m. This basin is strewn with huge boulders and partially covered with snow the whole summer. The western side of Bobotov Kuk is most impressive. Together with Bezimeni Vrh and Djevojka peaks, Bobotov Kuk (which is between them) form a large mountain wall and a type of natural amphitheatre. This wall is around 400m high and almost 2 km wide. Below this well are immense scree slopes, equally high, that descend steeply towards the bottom of the Skrka valley, which contains both Veliko Skrcko Jezero (1686m) and Malo Skrcko Jezero (1711m) lakes. This is reputed to be the most beautiful part of the Durmitor Mountain Range. On the south side, Bobotov Kuk drops steeply towards the basin of Zeleni Vir (2028m) lake. Zeleni Vir is found at the bottom of an amphitheater, about which a wall made up of the peaks Bobotov Kuk, Lucin Vrh, Minin Bogaz (2387m) stretch. South of the lake is Zupci (2309m), a string of cliffs that resemble the teeth of some dangerous dinosaur. The lower 300m of this side of Bobotov Kuk is mix of steep rocky terrain with much grass and scree. Above it is the summit pyramid.

Short history
Due to its isolated position, wild surroundings and volatile history of the continued struggle for Montenegrin liberation, Durmitor and its highest peak were not discovered (either scientifically or touristicly) until the mid-1800s. The first scientist was Amie Boue who wrote about the geology of Durmitor in his book ‘Geological Excursion in Turkish Europe’ in 1840. In 1883 Bobotov Kuk was first climbed by O. Baumann. Those were years of more intensified scientific research of the Durmitor region. In 1895 German geographer Kurt Hussert wrote the first book about the physical geography of Durmitor. At the end of the 19th century, Serbian botanist Josip Pancic discovered many endemic and rare floral species in the region. Extraordinary karst phenomena on Durmitor were first described by Serbian scientist Jovan Cvijic, who later became known for his "Das Karstphanomen" dissertation from 1893. The volatile early history of the 20th century prevented further research. The first organized mountaineering group visited Durmitor in 1926. They were members of Sljeme club from Zagreb, Croatia. In the same year the first ascents of the eastern face of Bobotov Kuk were achieved. In 193, two Austrians, Bauer and Obersteiner, climbed the first winter ascent via NW ridge of Bezimeni Vrh and some other peaks. In 1933 a group of Slovenian climbers first ascended the highest faces of the Durmitor range, those of Bezimeni Vrh and Bobotov Kuk above Skrka valley. A team of Slovenians also ascended the first winter climbs on the faces of highest peaks of Durmitor in 1940. Only after the II World War did Durmitor become a well known destination for tourists, hikers, climbers and skiers.

Climbing Bobotuv Kuk

The point of departure is from Zabljak, a resort town with all the amenities for a comfortable stay. Zabljak can be easily reached by a direct bus from the capital, Podgorica. From Zabljak itself the route to the peak is well marked with clear signposts and trail markings. It is approximately a ten-hour round trip as long as a moderate pace is maintained. The outward walk consists of approximately four to five hours hiking until the last ascent where it is a scramble to just below the peak. From there, climbers are directed to a slightly perilous path that winds its way up to the summit. Climbers should be aware that this is a strenuous hike, appropriate only for fit hikers.

References

Bobotov Kuk - 360° panorama from the summit

Mountains of Montenegro